No Problem is Fann Wong (Chinese: 范文芳)'s fourth album release in Taiwan. It has ten tracks. The title track is influenced by Irish and Celtic bubblegum pop. The 8th track, a romantic ballad called "Stay", is the theme song for both When I Fall in Love...With Both and Looking For Stars.

Track listing
沒有問題
也許
你的溫度
好想
發呆
好習慣
到底等什麼
Stay 
另一個城市
最近

Fann Wong albums
2000 albums